{{Infobox person
| name = Evelyn Francisco
| image = Evelyn Francisco motion1024.jpg
| imagesize = 
| birthname = Evelyn Barton 
| caption = 
| birth_date = 
| birth_place = Little Rock, Arkansas, U.S.
| death_date = 
| death_place = Corona, California, U.S.
| spouse = Samuel Bernheim (died 1934)<ref>Deaths, Los Angeles Times, May 19, 1934, pg. 12.</ref>
| relatives = Betty Francisco (sister)
| occupation = Actress
| yearsactive = 1923–1929}}

Evelyn Francisco (born Evelyn Barton; August 13, 1904 – January 27, 1963) was a silent era film actress who began as a bathing beauty. Her sisters Betty and Margaret Francisco were also actresses.

Biography
Born in Arkansas on August 13, 1904, Barton began acting in 1923. In The Goof (1924), directed by William Beaudine, she is one of a number of beauties called Spike Malone's diving girls. The seven-reel farce featured former William Fox actress, Alta Allen, as the head of the troupe. Spike was played by Chuck Relaner. In the 1924 Hollywood Follies Francisco was one of the Mack Sennett's bathing girls who performed at the Philharmonic Auditorium. Led by Harry Langdon, Thelma Parr was another of the select group of Sennett females who presented an act called All Wet.

In August 1925, the Francisco sisters were presented together at the Greenwich Village Cafe in the Christie Hotel, in Hollywood. At the time Francisco had just completed an important role in the first production of Julian Eltinge for the Christie Studios, a film entitled Madame Behave (1925).

She wore a novelty bathing suit of Russian ermine for a fashion pageant held at the Hotel Vista del Arroyo in Pasadena, California, in February 1927. The garment was designed and made by Colburn's of South Flower Street in Los Angeles, California.

Death
Francisco died on January 27, 1963, in Corona, California.

Partial filmography
 Madame Behave (1925)
 His First Flame (1927)
 King of the Herd'' (1927)

References

External links

1904 births
1963 deaths
American silent film actresses
Western (genre) film actresses
20th-century American actresses
Actresses from Little Rock, Arkansas